The Chairman of the Presidium of the Supreme Soviet of the Latvian Soviet Socialist Republic was the highest official in the Latvian Soviet Socialist Republic, which was in turn a part of the Soviet Union.

Below is a list of office-holders:

See also 
President of Latvia

Footnotes

Sources 
World Statesmen – Latvian Soviet Socialist Republic

Politics of Latvia
Latvian SSR
Lists of political office-holders in Latvia
List
List